Giovanni Costa (15 October 1826 – 31 January 1903), often known as Nino Costa, was an Italian landscape painter and patriotic revolutionary.

Biography

Giovanni Costa was born in Rome on 15 October 1826, the fourteenth of the sixteen children of Gioacchino Costa (died 1842) and Maria Chiappi (died 1857). His father was from Santa Margherita Ligure and as a young man had moved to Rome, where he opened a wool-spinning factory and achieved wealth and position. The family lived in a large house in Piazza San Francesco a Ripa, in Trastevere, close to the factory.

When he was 12 Giovanni was introduced to the neo-classical painter Baron Vincenzo Camuccini, who encouraged him to work from nature and from what he saw around him. Soon after was sent to the Jesuit college at Montefiascone, where remained for five years.

Costa returned to Rome in 1843, the year after the death of this father, and for two years attended the Collegio Bandinelli in the via Giulia, founded by Bartolommeo Bandinelli in 1678, where he was taught drawing by Luigi Durantini. He then worked for short time in the studio of Vincenzo Camuccini before entering the schools of the Accademia di San Luca, where he studied under Francesco Coghetti, Francesco Podesti and Filippo Agricola.

He fought under Garibaldi in 1848, and served as a volunteer in the war of 1859; his enthusiasm for Italian unity was actively shown again in 1870, when he was the first to mount the breach in the assault of Rome near the Porta Pia.

He had settled meanwhile at Florence, where his fight for the independence of art from worn-out traditions was no less strenuous. Here he completed a Donne sulla spiaggia di Porto d'Anzio (Girl on the Beach of Porto d'Anzio). He also became known as a landscape-painter of remarkable originality, and of great influence in the return to minute observation of nature. He painted, mainly rustic scenes involving herders and cattle. He was a major inspiration to the artists known as the Macchiaioli, and also had many English and American friends and followers, notably Elihu Vedder, Matthew Ridley Corbet (1850–1902) and his wife Edith Corbet, and Lord Carlisle, and was closely associated with Corot and the Barbizon school, whom he met while visiting Paris. In 1853, he established a lifetime friendship with a young Frederick Leighton, who was then sojourning in Rome.

His exile from Rome lasted until 1862. An exhibition of his pictures was held in London in 1904, and he is represented in the Tate Gallery. He died at Marina di Pisa on 31 January 1903.

References 

Attribution:

  This article incorporates text from a publication now in the public domain: Hugh Chisholm (editor) (1911). "Costa, Giovanni". Encyclopædia Britannica, 11th edition. 7: 219. Cambridge: Cambridge University Press.

1826 births
1903 deaths
Italian landscape painters
Painters from Rome
Campagna Romana
19th-century Italian painters
Italian male painters
20th-century Italian painters
19th-century Italian male artists
20th-century Italian male artists
Wikipedia articles incorporating a citation from the 1911 Encyclopaedia Britannica with Wikisource reference
Wikipedia articles incorporating text from the 1911 Encyclopædia Britannica